Sir William Gleadowe-Newcomen, 1st Baronet (1741–21 August 1807) was an Anglo-Irish politician.

Born William Gleadowe, he assumed the additional surname and arms of Newcomen following his marriage to Charlotte Newcomen, only child and heiress of Edward Newcomen, on 17 October 1772. On 9 October 1781 he was created a baronet, of Carrickglass in the Baronetage of Ireland.

Between 1790 and 1800 Gleadowe-Newcomen was the Member of Parliament for Longford County in the Irish House of Commons. Following the Acts of Union 1800, he represented Longford in the House of Commons of the United Kingdom between 1801 and 1802.

On 29 July 1800 Gleadowe-Newcomen's wife was created Baroness Newcomen in the Peerage of Ireland in honour of her husband, with the remainder to his male heirs. Upon Gleadowe-Newcomen's death in 1807 he was succeeded by his son, Thomas Gleadowe-Newcomen. He also had three daughters, the eldest of whom, Teresa, married Sir Charles Turner of Kirkleatham.

References

1741 births
1807 deaths
18th-century Anglo-Irish people
19th-century Anglo-Irish people
Irish MPs 1790–1797
Irish MPs 1798–1800
Baronets in the Baronetage of Ireland
Members of the Parliament of Ireland (pre-1801) for County Longford constituencies
Members of the Parliament of the United Kingdom for County Longford constituencies (1801–1922)
Newcomen family
UK MPs 1801–1802